İTÜ TV is the first Turkish television station. The first Turkish television broadcast occurred on July 9, 1952, from a station at Istanbul Technical University's electrical engineering department. Weekly two-hour broadcasts from ITU continued on an experimental basis, but by 1957 there were still fewer than 200 television receivers in Istanbul. ITU broadcasts continued until 1970, and in 1971 ITU's facilities and equipment were ordered to be transferred to the Turkish Radio and Television Corporation, and ITU TV was closed down forever. By 1991, ITU TV was replaced by a new channel called Show TV.

History
Mustafa Santur was the head of Istanbul Technical University. He came across the television for the first time in 1938. Switzerland, the Netherlands and Germany were making broadcast trials a few days a week. He went to Europe for television in 1948. After arriving in Europe, Mustafa Santur started working. Were the years of war. There was no television in Turkey. Television initiative of the University of ITU has been positive. Economic budget was limited. Turkey imports were banned in the early 1950s. That's why this could not get the materials. Philips company gave the camera to an ITU TV channel transmitter and gifts. Adnan Ataman completed his education in the United States, returned to Turkey. Ataman, is tasked with the launch of the television broadcast. Ataman has seen the television for the first time in the United States. Adnan Ataman, went to the Netherlands with his wife. He saw there the television devices. The devices came to Turkey. Laboratory for three small rooms were prepared. The largest of the three rooms will be used inside the studio. Antenna problem has arisen after everything is completed. Because it is not a television in Turkey, did not know that no human antenna works. Made in the 10-meter high mast. Although the weather was cold pole successfully planted. 100 watt verici Philips tarafından sağlanan ve bir süper depolama kamera ile yayına başlamıştır. The trial started broadcasting on March 9, 1952.

The studio is adjacent to the control and command room. Signal generator and the 35 mm movie projector image monitor and motion picture camera, and a record playing machine and sound monitor is available. Located at the other end of the corridor in the room has two small 100-watt transmitter. Are watching television in 1953, the Turkish people? questions are asked. Great appreciation and support of the people on the ITU TV's weekly broadcast schedule ring opens. The interest in the coming years improve the broadcast quality. In this period, the first cameraman, the first announcer with the first light and sound technician crossed the history of Turkish television. First cameraman Adnan Ataman. The first decor two consist of brown and gray curtain. First newsreader and television presenter Fatih Pasiner. To improve the technical quality for of the building  was erected antenna on October 17, 1959. In 1960, ITU TV has experienced stagnation period. The reason for the interruption is 1960 Turkish coup d'état. May 2, 1960 at 16.00 the ITU Radio and Television sealed by the police. Publications on 6 October 1960, started again. On November 17, 1960, the station has been switched to normal broadcasting. Live broadcasts take place in 1961. Channel, has moved to new premises on 5 December 1963. The power transmitter in 1963 increased to 500 Watts. Original first live broadcast on October 21, 1965 was the opening ceremony of the ITU TV. In fact, first live broadcast match took place on May 1, 1966. Television in the public sphere in Turkey was spoken. Began preparations for national television broadcasts in 1966 in Turkey. After preparation, the first closed-circuit broadcast was shown on the Assembly Budget Committee Date January 16, 1967. The first national television broadcast was made on January 31 mono 1968. First national television broadcast in mono format in Turkey was on January 31, 1968. TRT 1 began broadcasting on January 31, 1968. At the end of the 1960s was boycotted by television students. Makes the television broadcast ITU TV last 6 March 1970. on March 13 the broadcast is interrupted. TRT broadcasts began in 1971 in Istanbul, but using ITU TV materials. ITU TV in 1971 published in the last time match. ITU TV, did the last time television broadcast on May 19, 1971. After closing all the material he gave to TRT and ITU TV was permanently shut down at once. From March 1, 1991, ITU TV was replaced by a new channel called Show TV.

Firsts in the Turkish history of television
Television the first artist Feriha Tunceli. Then Nebahat Yedibaş, Cevdet Çağla and Hüsnü Coşar incomes. Over time, the quality and content of publications has increased the number of  audience. The number of publications on March 18, 1954 is an important date in terms of reaching the big audience. Arif Yaseri posted the first theater on television. Posted first theater game is "Letter". The game lasted 30 minutes.

Weather began broadcasting on television from 1954. Was one of the most interesting programs. Channel continued until closing. Is called to provide American Sydney Tweles program. But she does not know Turkish. One week later returned. Then Ali to deliver the program was called Inspire. January 13, 1955 was organized the first fashion show on television. Increased interest in television in 1956. First sports program began airing in 1957. Pertev Tunaseli was the first sports commentator on television.

In 1957 film was shown on television for the first time. "Hitit Güneşi" released film. Then Berduş film was shown. Zeki Müren was playing in the movie. Electricity was cut off when the movie was released. April 28, 1960 suspended publication for political reasons. First television quiz program was initiated in 1960. Halit Kıvanç, has offered a program called "Luck Bird". Another competition program, which started in 1960 is the "Mini Goal". 1961 begins interviews with singers and movie stars.

The first football match broadcast took place in 1961. Match was held at Inonu Stadium. Fenerbahçe-Galatasaray match on January 1, 1962 was published. On March 27, 1963 a Turkey-Italy match was broadcast live.

In 1962, Erkan Yolaç the classic quiz show started "Yes-No". Began broadcasting in 1963, English lessons. Let's Speak English program was very appreciated. Then began the German courses.

Turkey's first talk show program published in 1965. Fecri Ebcioğlu Show start running the show. Program Öztürk Serengil, Gönül Yazar, Barış Manço, has joined names such as Ajda Pekkan and Zeki Müren. On May 9, 1966 Golden Microphone Awards began to be published.

Program
 1952-1971: ITU News
 1953-1968: Music Show
 1954-1971: Weather
 1960-1970: Windfall
 1960-1962: Mini Goal
 1962-1965: Magazine
 1963-1964: Let's Speak English
 1965-1970: Fecri Ebcioğlu Show

Bibliography

References

Defunct television channels in Turkey
Turkish-language television stations
Television channels and stations established in 1952
1952 establishments in Turkey
Istanbul Technical University
1971 disestablishments in Turkey
Television channels and stations disestablished in 1971